Lisa Muskat (born in New Hampshire) is an American film producer. She is known for her frequent collaborations with David Gordon Green. She is a visiting lecturer at the Vermont College of Fine Arts. She is a Golden Shell winner.

Filmography
She was a producer in all films unless otherwise noted.

Film

Thanks

References

American film producers
Year of birth missing (living people)
Living people